Vidauban is a commune in the Var department in the Provence-Alpes-Côte d'Azur region in southeastern France.

It lies on the bank of the river Argens.

Geography

Climate

Vidauban has a hot-summer Mediterranean climate (Köppen climate classification Csa).

Population
Since the beginning of the 1980s Vidauban has experienced strong population growth. Within 20 years the population has more than doubled.

See also
Communes of the Var department

References

External links 

Official website

Communes of Var (department)